The 2007 Nebraska Cornhuskers football team represented the University of Nebraska–Lincoln in the 2007 NCAA Division I FBS football season. The team was coached by Bill Callahan and played their home games at Memorial Stadium in Lincoln, Nebraska.

Before the season
The Nebraska football team's schedule was rated the toughest in the Big 12 Conference, and the 12th toughest in the 2007 NCAA Division I FBS football season. The team had predictions to win the Big 12 North division.

After a tight competition with two-year backup Joe Ganz, former-Arizona State transfer quarterback Sam Keller won the starting position; Keller had spent the previous season on the scout team as per NCAA transfer rules.

Schedule

Roster and coaching staff

Game summaries

Nevada

Marlon Lucky was named the Walter Camp Football Foundation National Offensive Player of the Week for his career-best 233 yards rushing against Nevada.

Wake Forest

As ESPN described the game, "Sam Keller nearly gave away the game during his first road start at Nebraska. Zack Bowman jumped up to take it back for the Cornhuskers.  Three plays after Keller threw an interception deep in Nebraska territory, Bowman picked off a Wake Forest pass in the end zone and the 16th-ranked Cornhuskers held on to win 20–17 on Saturday."

USC

After a bye week, the Trojans visited the Nebraska Cornhuskers in Lincoln, Nebraska.  In the pre-season, the game was named as one of the candidates for the 10 most important games of 2007.  For the Huskers, the game was especially critical to their hopes of showing progress under 4th year head coach Bill Callahan. The game marks the first time a No. 1-ranked team has visited Lincoln since 1978. Because of the game's significance, ESPN College GameDay chose it as the site of its weekly broadcast.

Callahan had been criticized for his conservative play-calling during the 2006 game in Los Angeles; instead of playing to win, it appeared the Huskers were playing to not get blown out by the then-favored Trojans.  In that game the normally prolific West Coast offense of Nebraska, which had produced 541 yards a game, was corralled on the ground and attempted only 17 passes in a 28–10 Husker loss.  For 2007, Callahan pledged to play more aggressively, using running back Marlon Lucky and quarterback Sam Keller. Keller, the Huskers redshirt senior starting quarterback, was a 2006 transfer from Arizona State; as a Sun Devil Keller started the first seven games of his 2005 junior season, throwing for 2,165 yards, before a disastrous game against USC where, after leading ASU to a 21–3 halftime lead, he and the offense fell apart on the way to a 38–28 loss where he was sacked five times and threw five interceptions. Due to NCAA transfer rules, Keller spent the 2006 season on the Huskers' scout team.

The Trojans stayed in nearby Omaha and practiced at a local high school; Carroll took the rare step of closing practice to outsiders after a local radio station announced the location. The game marked the return of primary receiver Patrick Turner and running back Chauncey Washington from injury; linebacker Brian Cushing, who injured his ankle early against Idaho, had not fully recovered but was allowed to suit-up as a reserve. Senior center Matt Spanos remained injured, and true freshman Kris O'Dowd was called to start again.  Veteran secondary member Josh Pinkard was lost for the season after his sore knee gave out during a bye week practice, resulting in a torn ACL requiring surgery.

Anticipation for the game was high in Lincoln, fueling strong demand for tickets and accommodations; the game brought celebrities including USC fans Will Ferrell (also an alumnus) and Keanu Reeves, Nebraska fans Larry the Cable Guy, Supreme Court Justice Clarence Thomas, Rush Limbaugh, and Ward Connerly; past Husker Heisman-winner Mike Rozier, Trojans Heisman-winner Marcus Allen and star Trojans safety Ronnie Lott were also on hand for the game. The game fell on Pete Carroll's 56th birthday; as a surprise, Carroll was treated to a recorded message by actor Kiefer Sutherland, star of his favorite television show, 24. The morning recording of College GameDay attracted 13,293 fans, second to the all-time record of 15,808 set by Nebraska in 2001. With 84,959 in attendance, Nebraska recorded its NCAA-record 284th consecutive home sellout dating back to 1962.

USC dominated the game 49–31, in a game that was not as close as the final score indicated: the Trojans led 42–10 going into the fourth quarter; Nebraska scored two touchdowns in the final five minutes during garbage time. The Trojans dominated on the ground, as they out-gained Nebraska 313–31 in rushing yards and averaged 8.2 yards per carry, the most ever against a Nebraska team. Stafon Johnson led USC running backs with a career-best 144 yards in 11 carries with one touchdown; other major contributors were C. J. Gable (69 yards in four carries, including a 40-yard run), Washington (43 yards in 12 carries with two touchdowns), and another versatile performance by fullback Stanley Havili (52 rushing yards in two rushes with one touchdown, and three pass receptions for 22 yards with one touchdown).  The Trojans passing game again did not find a rhythm, with several dropped passes, but the defense was able to frustrate the Husker offense for most of the game and cause two pivotal 3rd quarter interceptions.

The Trojans did not escape injuries, as linebacker Clay Matthews, substituting for the recovering Brian Cushing, broke his thumb, causing Cushing to enter the game as his replacement.  The Trojans also suffered two injuries on kick returns: fullback Alfred Rowe suffered a mild concussion, and there was a moment of worry when returner Vincent Joseph, after being tackled and fumbling the ball, lay on the turf for over 10 minutes before being removed by stretcher with a bruised larynx and a neck sprain, but no serious injuries. Linebacker Rey Maualuga was flagged during a field goal attempt for the rarely called penalty of "disconcerting", which is given for "words or signals that disconcert opponents when they are preparing to put the ball in play".

After losing first place votes in the polls during the bye week, USC's performance regained six after their performance against the Huskers in a hostile environment. Receiving specific praise was the Trojans offensive line, as well as the continued poise and ability of freshman center O'Dowd.

Ball State

Iowa State

Missouri

Oklahoma State

Athletic Director Steve Pederson was fired after this game.  Former Nebraska head coach Tom Osborne was named as interim Athletic Director.  He indicated that there would be no coaching changes during the season."

Texas A&M

Texas

Nebraska first played the Texas Longhorns in 1933 and the Longhorns hold a 7–4–0 record. Nebraska won the first meeting by the lopsided score of 26–0.  As with Oklahoma State and Texas A&M, Nebraska plays the Longhorns two out of every four years as part of the Big 12 Conference schedule. Since their first meeting, the series has included a number of upsets and close calls.  In 1960 a #4 ranked Longhorn squad was upset by an unranked Nebraska team, 14–13.  In 1996 an unranked Texas team defeated #3 ranked Nebraska (who were also the defending national champions) 37–27 to win the inaugural Big 12 Conference football championship and deprive the Cornhuskers a shot at repeating as national champions.  In 1998 an unranked Texas team beat #7 Nebraska 20–16.

In 1999 the two teams met twice.  In the regular season, #18 Texas beat #3 Nebraska by 24–20. However, #3 Nebraska beat #12 Texas in the Big 12 Championship game, 6–22.  In 2002 the Longhorns were ranked No. 7 and they went to Lincoln, Nebraska to play an unranked Nebraska team. In front of the largest crowd in Nebraska history (78,268) the 'Horns snapped the Huskers' national-best 26-game winning streak at Memorial Stadium by a score of 27–24. Most recently, in the 2006 game, #5 Texas faced #17 Nebraska on a snowy day in Lincoln.  The Longhorns were trailing and needed a field goal by walk-on kicker Ryan Bailey (with just 23 seconds remaining in the game) to win 22–20.

On the morning of the game, oddsmakers favored Texas to win by 21 points. The weather forecast called for a high of 76 degrees and plentiful sunshine with winds NNE at 10 to 15 miles per hour. Texas stuck with their passing game for three quarters and was trailed Nebraska most of the way; the Cornhuskers led 17–9 to start the fourth. ESPN reported, "Once Texas figured out it should be running against one of the nation's worst run defenses, things turned out all right for the Longhorns."

The Longhorns may have switched to running game almost by chance.  McCoy took a hard hit as he scrambled outside the pocket and was shaken up badly enough to leave the game for a play.  John Chiles came in at quarterback; his one play, a zone-read handoff to Jamaal Charles, produced 24 yards.  According to ESPN, "suddenly Texas had figured out how to beat a Cornhuskers' team that had been steamrolled on the ground in recent weeks. Texas only threw three passes in the fourth quarter."

Once Texas switched to the zone read offense, they quickly started gaining yards and points.  Charles ran for a career-high 290 yards, including 216 yards and three long touchdown runs in the fourth quarter.  His tally also set a new record for rushing against the Cornhuskers, surpassing the old record of 247 yards by Oklahoma's Billy Simms.  Charles explained "It was my time to show everyone what I can do.  When I saw a hole, I blasted through it." Texas finished with 181 yards passing and 364 yards rushing; Nebraska had 315 yards passing and 132 yards rushing. The running back was named the Walter Camp Football Foundation National Offensive Player of the Week.

The game was a milestone for one coach and a millstone for another; it was the 100th win for Mack Brown at Texas; and it put more pressure on beleaguered Nebraska coach Bill Callahan.  Brown remarked on his victory, "A hundred is nice.  I knew the game was going to come down like it did.  It didn't surprise me.  They made sure that I'll remember it the rest of my life." Callahan was fired five weeks later.

Kansas

The Nebraska-Kansas series is the longest uninterrupted series in college football at 102 years. In the 2007 meeting, Kansas beat Nebraska 76–39. The Jayhawks set an all-time record for most touchdowns and most points scored by a Nebraska opponent. Their 48 points in the first half was the most ever scored against Nebraska in the first half. With the win, Kansas took their record to 9–0 for the first time since 1908.

Fox Sports reported, "It was only the second victory for Kansas in the last 39 games against Nebraska, which appears to be coming to pieces in the fourth season of embattled coach Bill Callahan."

Kansas State

Getting just his second career start after taking over for the injured Sam Keller in the fourth quarter of the Texas game, Joe Ganz broke the school single-game records for passing yards and touchdowns.

Colorado

It was a must-win situation for both teams, as they had identical 5–6 records and each needed a win to get to a bowl. Although they trailed by 11 points at the half, Colorado went on to win 65–51, as the Husker defense simply could not find an answer for Colorado's offense. Husker Coach Bill Callahan, having had his second losing season in four years, both being decided by a loss to Colorado, was fired the day after the game. Athletic Director Tom Osborne went on to hire Mark "Bo" Pelini as head coach.

Rankings

After the season
The team was coached by Bill Callahan, who returned for his fourth year with the Huskers, and expectations for the season were high, considering NU had reached the Big 12 title game the previous year. But the Huskers recorded only their second losing season since 1961, and the second in four years (the last one coming in 2004 on Callahan's watch). Following the conclusion of the season, Callahan was fired by interim athletic director Tom Osborne.

On December 2, 2007, Bo Pelini was named as head coach for Nebraska by interim athletic director Tom Osborne.

Awards

Draft picks, signees, or other future professional players
Prince Amukamara, 2011 1st–round pick of the New York Giants
Larry Asante, 2010 4th–round pick of the Cleveland Browns
Zackary Bowman, 2008 5th–round pick of the Chicago Bears
 Lance Brandenburgh, 2008 free agent signee of the San Francisco 49ers
 Chris Brooks, 2010 free agent signee of the Tampa Bay Buccaneers
 Brett Byford, 2008 free agent signee of the New York Jets
Jared Crick, 2012 4th-round pick of the Houston Texans
Phillip Dillard, 2010 4th–round pick of the New York Giants
 Joe Ganz, 2009 free agent signee of the Washington Redskins
Cody Glenn, 2009 5th–round pick of the Washington Redskins
 Tierre Green, 2008 free agent signee of the Green Bay Packers
Cortney Grixby, 2008 free agent signee of the Carolina Panthers
Eric Hagg, 2011 7th–round pick of the Cleveland Browns
Frantz Hardy, 2008 free agent signee of the Philadelphia Eagles
Roy Helu, Jr., 2011 4th–round pick of the Washington Redskins
Alex Henery, 2011 4th–round pick of the Philadelphia Eagles
 Ricky Henry, 2011 UFL 1st–round pick of the Hartford Colonials
 Brandon Johnson, Sioux City Bandits
 Andre Jones, Central Valley Coyotes
 D.J. Jones, 2011 UFL 6th–round pick of the Omaha Nighthawks
Marcel Jones, 2012 7th-round draft pick of the New Orleans Saints
Sam Keller, 2008 free agent signee of the Tampa Bay Buccaneers
Marlon Lucky, 2009 free agent signee of the Cincinnati Bengals
 Corey McKeon, 2008 free agent signee of the Tampa Bay Buccaneers
Lydon Murtha, 2009 7th–round pick of the Miami Dolphins
Carl Nicks, 2008 5th–round pick of the New Orleans Saints
 Matt O'Hanlon, 2010 free agent signee of the Carolina Panthers
Steve Octavien, 2008 free agent signee of the Kansas City Chiefs
Niles Paul, 2011 5th–round pick of the Washington Redskins
 Todd Peterson, 2009 free agent signee of the Jacksonville Jaguars
Zach Potter, 2009 free agent signee of the New York Jets
 Andy Poulosky, Sioux City Bandits
Maurice Purify, 2008 free agent signee of the Cincinnati Bengals
Bo Ruud, 2008 6th–round pick of the New England Patriots
Matt Slauson, 2009 6th–round pick of the New York Jets
 Mike Smith, 2011 UFL 5th–round pick of the Omaha Nighthawks
 Ty Steinkuhler, 2009 free agent signee of the New York Jets
Ndamukong Suh, 2010 1st–round pick of the Detroit Lions
Nate Swift, 2009 free agent signee of the Denver Broncos
Barry Turner, 2010 free agent signee of the Detroit Lions
Keith Williams, 2011 6th–round pick of the Pittsburgh Steelers
 Kenny Wilson, Sioux City Bandits

References

Nebraska
Nebraska Cornhuskers football seasons
Nebraska Cornhuskers football